The women's relay competition of the Biathlon European Championships 2011 was held on February 24, 2011 at 12:30 local time.

External links
 Results

Biathlon European Championships 2011
2011 in Italian women's sport